H. celebensis may refer to:

Harpyionycteris celebensis, the Sulawesi harpy fruit bat, a bat species
Hylarana celebensis, a frog species